National Police Directorate a government agency subordinate to the Ministry of Justice and Public Security which heads the Norwegian Police Service. The directorate is led by the National Police Commissioner (Politidirektør), who since 2012 has been Odd Reidar Humlegård.

In Norway there is only one police force. The organisation of the Norwegian Police is largely based on the principle of an integrated police, that is that all the functions of the police are collected in one organisation.

See also
 Task Force for Economical and Fraud crimes
 Police Security Service

References

External links
 Official website 

Law enforcement in Norway
Government agencies of Norway
National Central Bureaus of Interpol
2001 establishments in Norway
Government agencies established in 2001